Cold Creek Manor is a 2003 American  thriller film directed by Mike Figgis, and starring Dennis Quaid, Sharon Stone, Stephen Dorff, Juliette Lewis, Kristen Stewart and Christopher Plummer. The screenplay by Richard Jefferies tells the story of a family terrorized by the former owner of the rural estate they bought in foreclosure.

Plot

Cooper Tilson, his wife Leah and their two children, Kristen and Jesse, move from New York to the country after purchasing a mansion. The previous owner, Dale Massie, convinces Cooper to hire him to help with repairs. Dale, recently released from prison, initially appears to be a good, kind worker.
 
As Cooper sorts through the mess in the house, he comes across many old documents and photographs, and decides to record the history of the building on film. A series of unusual incidents start to occur; Cooper is pursued by an unknown car, multiple venomous snakes are found in the property, and Kristen's horse is mysteriously killed, leading Cooper to suspect Dale. Cooper also witnesses Dale strike his girlfriend Ruby in a crowded bar.

To learn the details of the manor's past, Cooper visit's Dale's aging, demented father who lives in a nearby nursing home. The man's disjointed comments lead Cooper to believe Dale murdered his wife and children who have been missing for several years; Dale claims his wife fled with the children when he was imprisoned. Sheriff Annie Ferguson, Ruby's sister, is initially skeptical about Cooper's accusation but later slowly starts to believe he may be correct.

One afternoon after a heated argument with Dale, Cooper finds a dental retainer along with human teeth in the gravel of his driveway, which he compares to old photos and finds it matches that of Dale's daughter. Afraid for his family's safety, Cooper sends them back to stay in the city while he attempts to gather more evidence to incriminate Dale. Meanwhile, Dale visits his father and smothers him to death when he insults him and reveals his knowledge of Dale's crimes.

Later that night as a storm approaches, Leah returns to the house alone, having been informed by the children the location of a deep well on the property, called the Devil's Throat. She and Cooper lower a video camera into the well and find the rotting corpses of Dale's wife and children. Cooper contacts Sheriff Ferguson, unaware Dale has attacked and disabled her and she is unconscious in her office. Dale goes to Devils Throat and punctures Cooper's truck tires. Dale pushes Leah into the well but Cooper manages to pull her out. They get back to the house where Dale has torched Leah's car. The Tilsons find themselves trapped in the house as Dale cuts the electricity.

After a chase, Dale corners Cooper and Leah atop the roof, and openly declares his intent to kill them and dump their bodies down the Devil's Throat like he did to his family. The couple charge at him with a line of rope, knocking him off his feet, then bind him against a roof lantern. Cooper shatters the skylight, sending Dale to his death.

Dale's wife and children's remains are recovered and then entombed in the family graveyard at Cold Creek Manor, as are his own. The Tilsons continue to live in Cold Creek Manor.

Cast

Production
The film was shot on location in Cambridge, Kitchener, Ayr, Brougham and Toronto, Ontario.

Release

Critical response
The movie received negative reviews from critics. It holds a 12% rating on Rotten Tomatoes based on 111 reviews, with an average rating of 3.8/10. The site's consensus states: "The plot of Cold Creek Manor is too predictable and contrived to generate suspense". On Metacritic — which assigns a weighted mean score — the film has a score of 37 out of 100 based on 31 critics, indicating "generally negative reviews". Audiences surveyed by CinemaScore gave the film a grade "C−" on a scale of A+ to F.

Stephen Holden of The New York Times observed, "A serious filmmaker like Mike Figgis can be forgiven, I suppose, for slumming, when he's got a cast as stellar as the one that infuses the scream-by-numbers thriller Cold Creek Manor with more psychological credibility than its screenplay merits". He said the film "belongs to the Cape Fear tradition of thrillers in which the mettle of a civilized family man is tested in a life-or-death struggle with crude macho evil".

Roger Ebert of the Chicago Sun-Times rated the film 1½ stars and called it "an anthology of cliches" and "a thriller that thrills us only if we abandon all common sense". He added, "Of course preposterous things happen in all thrillers, but there must be at least a gesture in the direction of plausibility, or we lose patience".

Edward Guthmann of the San Francisco Chronicle said, "As haunted-house thrillers go, Cold Creek Manor is more ludicrous than the average but at the same time more handsomely produced. Hokum with a big-budget gloss, it's a simple, formulaic nail-biter ... The script ... grafts from every possible thriller – most of which had pilfered their predecessors – and loads on implausibilities until we wonder why the actors play it seriously".

Peter Travers of Rolling Stone rated the film one star and commented, "It's sad to see risk-taking director Mike Figgis do a generic thriller for a paycheck and then not even screw with the rules . . . the only things haunting this movie are cliches".

Steve Persall of the St. Petersburg Times graded the film D and thought "all this bad acting and run-of-the-thrill dialogue might be entertaining if something would just happen besides a silly snake scare and a wan truck chase. The movie plays like an all-star episode of This Old House for the first hour, a telenovela for the next 30 minutes, then, finally, a hack boogeyman flick in the last reel. This isn't a movie, it's channel surfing".

Todd McCarthy of Variety called the film "a woefully predictable imperiled-yuppie-family-under-siege suspenser that hardly seems worth the attention of its relatively high-profile participants. Taking a break from his multiple-perspective digicam experiments, helmer Mike Figgis displays at best a half-hearted interest in delivering the commercial genre goods, while Dennis Quaid and Sharon Stone fish in vain to find any angles to play in their dimension-free characters".

Box office
The film opened in 2,035 theaters in the United States on September 19, 2003, and grossed $8,190,574 in its opening weekend, ranking #5 at the box office, behind Underworld, Secondhand Lions, The Fighting Temptations and Once Upon a Time in Mexico. It eventually earned $21,386,011 in the United States and $7,733,423 in foreign markets, for a total worldwide box office of $29,119,434.

Home media
Buena Vista Home Entertainment released the film on Region 1 DVD on March 2, 2004. It is in anamorphic widescreen format with audio tracks in English and French, and subtitles in Spanish. Bonus features include commentary with director Mike Figgis; deleted scenes and an alternate ending; Rules of the Game, in which Figgis discusses the components of a psychological thriller; and Cooper's Documentary, in which he discusses the process of making the film within the film. A Blu-ray edition was released September 4, 2012.

Notes

References

External links
 
 
 

2003 films
2003 horror films
2000s mystery films
American horror thriller films
2003 psychological thriller films
American mystery thriller films
American psychological thriller films
American thriller drama films
2000s English-language films
Films directed by Mike Figgis
Films about families
Films about snakes
Films set in country houses
Films shot in Ontario
Touchstone Pictures films
2000s American films